|}

The Curragh Stakes is a Listed flat horse race in Ireland open to two-year-old thoroughbreds. It is run at the Curragh over a distance of 5 furlongs (1,006 metres), and it is scheduled to take place each year in August.

History
The event was first run in 1932, run as The Curragh Foal Plate until 1956 and The Curragh Foal Stakes in 1957 and 1958. It was classed at Group 3 level in 1971. For a period it was usually staged in July. It was discontinued after 1996.

The Curragh Stakes was revived in 2008, and from this point it held Listed status. It became known as the Grangecon Stud Stakes in 2009. It was switched to August in 2010, and reverted to its former title in 2011. The race was upgraded to Group 3 in 2015 and downgraded back to Listed status in 2018.

Records
Leading jockey since 1985 (6 wins):
 Colin Keane - Ainippe (2014), Bear Cheek (2015), Treasuring (2017), Frenetic (2020), Head Mistress (2021), Mauiewowie (2022) 

Leading trainer since 1985 (8 wins):
 Ger Lyons - Pasar Silbano (2008), Ainippe (2014), Bear Cheek (2015), Treasuring (2017), Frenetic (2020), Head Mistress (2021), Mauiewowie (2022)

Winners since 1985

Earlier winners

 1932: Smart Alec
 1933: Moonstone
 1934: Blanco
 1935: Solo Whist
 1936: Appointment
 1937: My Jewel
 1938: Red Ruffian
 1939: Poker Chip
 1940: Dunserverick
 1941: King Kling
 1942: The Phoenix
 1943: Upper Set
 1944: Mafosta
 1945: Campaigner
 1946: Precious Rose
 1947: Morning Wings
 1948: Ballywillwill
 1949: Mighty Ocean
 1950: Sheilas Cabin
 1951: Stella Aurata
 1952: Banri Calma
 1953: Gorm Anna
 1954: Trouville
 1955: Bellette
 1956: Silken Glider
 1957: Golden Game
 1958: His Legend
 1959: Hobson
 1960: Dorney Common
 1961: Golden Sovereign
 1962: Majority Rule
 1963: Blue Marine
 1964: Adriatic Star
 1965: Lady Matador
 1966: Jadeite
 1967: Sorrentina
 1968: Soho Lad
 1969: Cinerama Two
 1970: Supernatural
 1971: Mirraglo *
 1972: Chamozzle
 1973: Noble Mark
 1974: Mini Gift
 1975: National Wish
 1976: Nebbiolo
 1977: Perla
 1978: Phil's Fancy
 1979: Jay Bird
 1980: Crimson Heather
 1981: Peterhof
 1982: Virginia Deer
 1983: Safe Home
 1984: Zaius

* Wind Drift finished first in 1971, but he was disqualified for carrying an incorrect weight.

See also
 Horse racing in Ireland
 List of Irish flat horse races

References

 Paris-Turf:
 Racing Post:

 horseracingintfed.com – International Federation of Horseracing Authorities – Curragh Stakes (2017).
 pedigreequery.com – Curragh Stakes – Curragh.

Flat races in Ireland
Curragh Racecourse
Flat horse races for two-year-olds
1932 establishments in Ireland
Recurring sporting events established in 1932